Academia Semillas del Pueblo Xinaxcalmecac is an Indigenous Mexican public charter school of the Los Angeles Unified School District (LAUSD). It offers instruction in grades Kindergarten through eighth, and is located in the community of El Sereno, on the east side of Los Angeles.  The school, which opened in 2002, was founded by Marcos Aguilar, a former teacher at Garfield Senior High School.

External links 

Los Angeles Unified School District schools
Indigenous Mexican schools in California
Charter K–8 schools in California
El Sereno, Los Angeles
Eastside Los Angeles
Mexican-American culture in Los Angeles
Schools in Los Angeles
Educational institutions established in 2001
2001 establishments in California
Native Americans in Los Angeles